Phou Kout is a district (muang) of Xiangkhouang province in north-central Laos. The district includes the seldom visited Site 25 of the Plain of Jars.

References

Districts of Xiangkhouang province